Camp Pioneer may refer to:

 Camp Pioneer (Oregon)
 Camp Pioneer (Arkansas)
 Camp Pioneer (Louisiana)
 Camp Pioneer (New Mexico)

See also
Manitoba Pioneer Camp
Young Pioneer camp